Selma Vilhunen (born October 1976 in Turku) is a Finnish film maker.

Vilhunen and fellow producer Kirsikka Saari received an Academy Awards nomination in the category of Best Live Action Short Film for the 2013 film Do I Have to Take Care of Everything?.

Selected filmography
 Little Wing (2016)
 Stupid Young Heart (2018)
 Hobbyhorse Revolution a movie about Hobby horsing

References

External links

1976 births
Finnish film directors
Finnish women film directors
Living people